Diego Ladislao Oyarbide (born in Rosario, Argentina,  is a former Argentine manager and footballer who played for clubs of Argentina, Chile, Colombia, Venezuela and El Salvador.

Teams as footballer 
 Nueva Chicago 1993
 Regional Atacama 1994
 Newell's Old Boys 1994–1995
 Godoy Cruz 1995–1996
 Argentino (R) 1996–1997
 Huracán de Corrientes 1997–1998
 Atlanta 1998–1999
 Atlético Bucaramanga 1999
 Huracán de San Rafael 2000–2001
 Trujillanos FC 2001
 Águila 2002
 Isidro Metapán 2002
 Sportivo Las Parejas 2003–2007

Teams as manager 
 Sportivo Las Parejas 2007 - 2008
 Studebaker (Villa Cañas) 2011 - 2015
 Sportivo Las Parejas 2015–2017
 Unión Futbol Club 2017
  Argentino de Rosario (2021)

References
 

1972 births
Living people
Argentine footballers
Argentine expatriate footballers
Nueva Chicago footballers
Newell's Old Boys footballers
Godoy Cruz Antonio Tomba footballers
Argentino de Rosario footballers
Huracán Corrientes footballers
Club Atlético Atlanta footballers
Trujillanos FC players
Atlético Bucaramanga footballers
Regional Atacama footballers
C.D. Águila footballers
A.D. Isidro Metapán footballers
Categoría Primera A players
Expatriate footballers in Chile
Expatriate footballers in Colombia
Expatriate footballers in Venezuela
Expatriate footballers in El Salvador
Association footballers not categorized by position
Footballers from Rosario, Santa Fe